Anne Elise Thompson (born July 8, 1934) is a senior United States district judge of the United States District Court for the District of New Jersey. She was the first female and first African American federal judge in New Jersey.

Family
Anne is the daughter of Leroy H. Jenkins and Mary E. Jackson. Her father was a dentist and her mother was originally from Wilson, North Carolina, which was a town of strict segregation, but also was said to be "the bright leaf tobacco market for the East".

Education and career

Born in Philadelphia, Pennsylvania, Thompson received a Bachelor of Arts degree from Howard University in 1955, a Master of Arts from Temple University in 1957, and a Bachelor of Laws from Howard University School of Law in 1964. She was an attorney in the Office of the Solicitor of the United States Department of Labor in Chicago, Illinois from 1964 to 1965. She was a grant writer for United Progress, Inc. from 1966 to 1967. She became an assistant deputy public defender for the New Jersey Office of the Public Defender in the Mercer-Somerset-Hunterdon Region of Trenton, New Jersey from 1967 to 1970. She was the Municipal Prosecutor for Lawrence Township in Lawrenceville, New Jersey from 1970 to 1972. She was a municipal court judge for the City of Trenton, New Jersey from 1972 to 1975. She was a prosecutor for Mercer County, New Jersey from 1975 to 1979.

Federal judicial service

On September 28, 1979, Thompson was nominated by President Jimmy Carter to a new seat on the United States District Court for the District of New Jersey created by 92 Stat. 1629. She was confirmed by the United States Senate on October 31, 1979, and received her commission on November 2, 1979. Judge Thompson was the first woman to serve as a federal district court judge in the state of New Jersey. She was also the first African American federal judge to serve in the state of New Jersey. She served as Chief Judge from 1994 to 2001, and assumed senior status on June 1, 2001.

See also 
 List of African-American federal judges
 List of African-American jurists
 List of first women lawyers and judges in New Jersey

References

Sources 
 

1934 births
Living people
African-American judges
Judges of the United States District Court for the District of New Jersey
United States district court judges appointed by Jimmy Carter
20th-century American judges
Howard University alumni
Howard University School of Law alumni
Temple University alumni
Lawyers from Philadelphia
Public defenders
21st-century American judges
20th-century American women judges
21st-century American women judges